André-Gilles Fortin (November 13, 1943 – June 24, 1977) was a Canadian politician. Fortin was a member of the House of Commons of Canada for Lotbinière. He was first elected in the 1968 federal election for the Ralliement Créditiste, which in 1971 merged with the Social Credit Party of Canada.

Fortin was elected leader of the party on November 7, 1976, after his popular predecessor, Réal Caouette, was forced to resign due to illness. The party was then struggling, having lost almost all its support in the west and in decline in Quebec where its members were divided between support for Canadian federalism and for sovereignty association for Quebec, a position supported by René Matte whom Fortin defeated for the leadership. Fortin's efforts to rebuild the party were cut short when he was killed after only eight months as leader.

Fortin died in a car crash at about three in the morning on June 24, 1977, at the age of 33. It is believed that he fell asleep while driving and his car went off the highway, where it missed a bridge and jumped over a river, slamming into the embankment on the other side. The accident took place on the Trans-Canada Highway between Montreal and Quebec City. At the time of his death, he had two young children.

Réal Caouette's son, Gilles Caouette, became acting leader of the party five days later.

Archives 
There is a André-Gilles Fortin fonds at Library and Archives Canada. Archival reference number is R7123.

Electoral record

References

External links
 

1943 births
1977 deaths
20th-century Canadian politicians
Accidental deaths in Quebec
Members of the House of Commons of Canada from Quebec
Road incident deaths in Canada
Social Credit Party of Canada MPs
Social Credit Party of Canada leaders